The fourth season of the American television comedy series Louie premiered on May 5, 2014, and concluded on June 16, 2014. It consists of fourteen episodes (an additional episode more than previous seasons), most running approximately 23 minutes in length. FX broadcast the fourth season on Mondays at 10:00 and 10:30 pm in the United States with back-to-back episodes. The season was produced by 3 Arts Entertainment and the executive producers were Louis C.K., Dave Becky and M. Blair Breard.

Louie was created, written and directed by Louis C.K., who stars as a fictionalized version of himself, a comedian and newly divorced father raising his two daughters in New York City. The show has a loose format atypical for television comedy series, consisting of largely unconnected storylines and segments (described as "extended vignettes") that revolve around Louie's life, punctuated by live stand-up performances.

Production
FX announced in July 2012 that it had renewed Louie for a fourth season to consist of 13 episodes, and was later confirmed in October 2012 that the season would be delayed from airing in summer 2013 to May 2014, to give more time for Louie C.K. to develop the season. C.K. said, "I want season four to go somewhere new...I'm looking back to when I did the first season and the time I took to do the show and decide which directions to go in and I want that back again. I want a little breathing room." In March 2014, FX announced the season would premiere on May 5, 2014, moving to Mondays and would air back-to-back episodes for seven consecutive weeks, containing an additional fourteenth episode. C.K. said that the fourth season would include a multi-part, connected storyline after the third episode.

C.K. collaborated with comedian Steven Wright (who previously guest starred on the series as himself) on some of the scripts for the fourth season, and Wright is credited as a consulting producer for the season. According to guest star Jeremy Renner, Philip Seymour Hoffman was supposed to appear in an episode this season, however, Hoffman died in February 2014. Episodes 11 and 12, "In the Woods" have an extended run time of an hour and a half (with commercials).

Cast

Main cast
 Louis C.K. as Louie

Recurring cast

Guest stars

Episodes

Reception

Reviews
The fourth season of Louie received universal acclaim from critics, receiving a Metacritic score of 93 out of 100, based on 28 reviews. Robert Llyod of the Los Angeles Times wrote that  "Each [episode] stands on its own as a TV art film, an independent work of short fiction." Andrew Romano of The Daily Beast wrote that "Season 4 is just as brilliant as the seasons that preceded it." On Rotten Tomatoes, the season has an approval rating of 93% with an average score of 8.9 out of 10 based on 43 reviews. The website's critical consensus reads, "Thanks to Louis C.K.'s unique brand of awkward, brutally honest humor, Louie remains one of the best written and most relatable comedies on television."

Ratings
The season 4 premiere received 941,000 total viewers, a 19 percent boost over last season's average.

Accolades
For the 30th TCA Awards, Louie won for Outstanding Achievement in Comedy and Louis C.K. received a nomination for Individual Achievement in Comedy. For the 4th Critics' Choice Television Awards, Louie received nominations for Best Comedy Series, C.K. for Best Actor in a Comedy Series, and Sarah Baker for Best Guest Performer in a Comedy Series. For the 66th Primetime Emmy Awards, the series was nominated for Outstanding Comedy Series, and Louie C.K. was nominated for Outstanding Lead Actor in a Comedy Series and Outstanding Directing for a Comedy Series for the episode "Elevator, Part 6", and won for Outstanding Writing for a Comedy Series for the episode "So Did the Fat Lady". For the 67th Writers Guild of America Awards, the series won for Best Comedy Series and C.K. won for Best Episodic Comedy for "So Did the Fat Lady". For the 21st Screen Actors Guild Awards, C.K. was nominated for Best Comedy Actor. For the 72nd Golden Globe Awards, C.K. was nominated for Best Actor – Television Series Musical or Comedy. For the 67th Directors Guild of America Awards, C.K. was nominated for Outstanding Directing – Comedy Series for the episode "Elevator Part 6".

Broadcast
The season premiered on OSN First Comedy HD in the Middle East on September 4, 2014.

References

External links
 

2014 American television seasons